Held to Answer is a 1923 American silent drama film directed by Harold M. Shaw The film is considered to be lost.

Cast 
 House Peters as John Hampstead
 Grace Carlyle as Mariann Dounay
 John St. Polis as Hiram Burbeck (as John Sainpolis)
 Evelyn Brent as Bessie Burbeck
 James Morrison as Rollie Burbeck
 Lydia Knott as Mrs. Burbeck
 Bull Montana as 'Red' Lizard
 Gale Henry as The Maid
 Tom Guise as The Judge (as Thomas Guise)
 William Robert Daly as The Organist (as Robert Daly)
 Charles West as 'Spider' Welch
 Charles Hill Mailes as District Attorney Searle (as Charles Mailes)

References

External links 

1923 films
1923 drama films
1923 lost films
Silent American drama films
American silent feature films
American black-and-white films
Films directed by Harold M. Shaw
Lost American films
Lost drama films
1920s American films